600 Congress (formerly known as One American Center) is a high-rise office building located at the northwest corner of West 6th Street and Congress Avenue in the Financial District of Downtown Austin, the state capital of Texas. The construction of One American Center was completed in 1984 and was developed by Rust Properties. It was the tallest building in Austin until the finishing of the Frost Bank Tower in 2003. In 2017, One American Center was rebranded as 600 Congress.

Annually, Make-A-Wish Central and South Texas has a fundraising event called "Over The Edge," in which the first 300 persons to raise $1,500 in donations get to rappel 32 stories down 600 Congress.

History
Construction on the One American Center began on August 16, 1982. The building replaced a former 2-story Art Deco-style Woolworth's Department Store, which had since housed a 5 and dime at the time of the building's demolition. Street-front diagonal parking on Congress Avenue was removed to make way for an expanded granite sidewalk and landscaping, including two rows of Texas red oak trees. A matching 22-story hotel was originally planned on the northwest corner of the property adjoining the building, but was never built.

Architecture
The postmodern building was designed by Houston-based Morris-Aubry Architects. The building is designed with three stair-stepped tiers clad in pre-cast limestone trimmed with brown granite. The 20,000 cubic feet of granite consists of Sunset Red granite from Marble Falls, Texas and Charlie Brown granite from Oklahoma, which was cut and polished in Puebla, Mexico. The ground level facade of the building contains notches to give the appearance of individual storefronts.

References

External links

 

Skyscraper office buildings in Austin, Texas
1982 establishments in Texas
Office buildings completed in 1982
Leadership in Energy and Environmental Design gold certified buildings
Postmodern architecture in Texas